The 1998 Denmark Open in badminton was held in Vejle, from October 14 to October 18, 1998. It was a four-star tournament and the prize money was US$120,000.

Venue
Vejle Idraets Center, Vejle

Final results

References

Denmark Open
Denmark